David Chan is an American violinist and a concertmaster of the Metropolitan Opera Orchestra. In recent years he has become active as a conductor.

Biography
He was born in San Diego, California. His parents, natives of Taiwan, met as graduate students at Stanford University. He began his musical education at age 3 when his parents enrolled him in a violin class.  At age 14 he won the San Diego Symphony's Young Arts Concerto Competition, which enabled him to appear with the orchestra in two series of concerts. He was also the featured soloist with the San Diego Youth Symphony on their tour of Austria, Germany, Hungary and the former Czechoslovakia.

He received a bachelor's degree from Harvard University, and a master's degree from the Juilliard School in 1997, where he is currently on the faculty.  His principal teachers were Dorothy DeLay, Hyo Kang and Michael Tseitlin. He won the 5th prize at the International Tchaikovsky Competition, and the third place bronze medal (with $10,000) and the Josef Gingold Prize at the International Violin Competition of Indianapolis.

He made his New York debut in on October 2, 1995, playing Paganini's Concerto no. 2 with the Juilliard orchestra led by Hugh Wolff.

He has performed throughout the United States, Europe, and the Far East, appearing as soloist with such orchestras as the Moscow State Symphony Orchestra, the Los Angeles Philharmonic, the National Symphony Orchestra of Taiwan, the Aspen Chamber Symphony, the San Diego Symphony, Indianapolis Symphony Orchestra, the Richmond Symphony Orchestra, Springfield Symphony Orchestra, and the Northbrook Symphony Orchestra. He has released two recordings: a recital album and a disc of two Paganini concertos with the English Chamber Orchestra, both for the Ambassador label.

He became one of the Metropolitan Opera's concertmasters in 2000.  On February 2, 2003, the occasion of a Met Orchestra performance, he made his Carnegie Hall solo debut playing Brahms's Concerto for Violin, Cello and Orchestra with Met colleague cellist Rafael Figueroa.  He was the soloist in Sofia Gubaidulina's In Tempus Praesens (concerto for violin and orchestra) with the Met Orchestra in 2012. For Handel's Giulio Cesare, Chan appeared onstage in costume during one of David Daniels' arias to supply the obbligato violin part.

Chan's career has included ample participation in chamber music.  Articles from 1998 and 1999 show him as one of three members of the Emelin Trio. He has been a frequent guest at Japan's Pacific Music Festival, the Seattle Chamber Music Festival, and La Jolla's SummerFest. He has also played chamber music with Lang Lang in a "Lang Lang With Friends" concert.

With the Met Chamber Ensemble, he has played in Alban Berg's Chamber Concerto for Piano and Violin with 13 Wind Instruments, Richard Strauss's Le Bourgeois Gentilhomme suite, Olivier Messiaen's Quatuor pour la fin du temps  and other works, classical and contemporary.

He joined the faculty of the Juilliard School in 2005. He is also a faculty member at Mannes School of Music. In June 2018, Chan was named music director of Camerata Notturna, a chamber orchestra based in New York City.

He can be heard on the soundtrack of the films Teeth and The Caller.

Conducting 
As a conductor, Chan serves as music director of the Camerata Notturna, a position he has held since 2018, and of the Montclair Orchestra, which he was appointed to in 2016.  In the 2018–19 season, he made his Carnegie Hall conducting debut, and traveled to Europe for performances with L'Orchestre Philharmonique Royal de Liège and L'Orchestre Dijon Bourgogne, among others.

Wine 
After marrying his wife, violinist and Met colleague Catherine Ro, his father-in-law gave him a box of good wine. Once he joined the Met Orchestra, he befriended colleagues who were wine connoisseurs. His budding interest led to an obsession with Burgundy wine, to the point where he knew almost every vineyard on the Côte-d'Or.

His interest in wine led him to meet with Bernard Hervet, former chief executive of Maison Faiveley, and Aubert de Villaine of Domaine de la Romanee-Conti. Their meeting resulted in the founding of the festival Musique et Vin au Clos Vougeot in the Burgundy region of France, of which Chan is the music director.

Personal life 
He is married to the violinist Catherine Ro. They have three children, Annalise, Micah, and Arianna.

Discography 
David Chan: La Campanella
Beethoven: Violin Concerto (Park Avenue Chamber Symphony, David Bernard, conductor)
Great Duos For Violin And Cello (with Rafael Figueroa, cellist)

Notes

References

External links 
Official website
 
 David Chan at Met Orchestra Musicians' website

American classical violinists
Male classical violinists
American male violinists
Juilliard School alumni
Juilliard School faculty
Harvard University alumni
Prize-winners of the International Tchaikovsky Competition
Year of birth missing (living people)
Living people
Concertmasters
Musicians from San Diego
American musicians of Taiwanese descent
Metropolitan Opera people
American male conductors (music)
21st-century American conductors (music)
21st-century classical violinists
21st-century American violinists